Norberto Oberburger (born 1 December 1960 in Merano ) is a retired Italian heavyweight weightlifter who won a gold medal at Summer Olympics.

Biography
In 1984 he placed second to Yury Zakharevich at the European Championships, but won a gold medal at the Los Angeles Olympics, which were boycotted by the Soviet Union. Oberburger then won bronze medals at the 1985 world and 1986 European championships, both times behind Zakharevich.

Achievements

References

External links
 

1960 births
Living people
Sportspeople from Merano
Italian male weightlifters
Olympic weightlifters of Italy
Weightlifters at the 1980 Summer Olympics
Weightlifters at the 1984 Summer Olympics
Weightlifters at the 1988 Summer Olympics
Weightlifters at the 1992 Summer Olympics
Olympic gold medalists for Italy
Olympic medalists in weightlifting
Medalists at the 1984 Summer Olympics
20th-century Italian people
21st-century Italian people